The Very Best of Otis Redding, Vol. 1 is an album by American soul singer-songwriter Otis Redding, released in 1992.

Track listing

Personnel
Otis Redding – vocals

Certifications

References

Otis Redding albums
1993 greatest hits albums
Compilation albums published posthumously
Rhino Entertainment compilation albums